Coco is a 2009 French comedy film written, directed, and starring Gad Elmaleh. The film is based on a character sketch he created for his one-man show "La Vie Normale". The film earned $8.5 million in its opening weekend at the French box office, and went on to gross $11.7 million in the European market. Although it was a box office success, Coco was not well received by critics. It received only one star out of four from Première, Paris Match, and Télérama, and two stars from Elle and Le Journal du Dimanche.

Synopsis
Coco is a wealthy Maghrebi Jewish businessman and an immigrant to France. After 15 years of financial success (due to his invention of a new type of sparkling water) he decides to throw an enormous bar mitzvah celebration for his son Samuel. Determined that the celebration will be the most fantastic event of the year, Coco alienates his entire family as he plans for the gala.

Cast 

Gad Elmaleh : Coco
Pascale Arbillot : Agathe
Jean Benguigui : Zerbib
Manu Payet : Steve
Ary Abittan : Max
Daniel Cohen : Mimo
Noémie Lvovsky : Brigitte
Gladys Cohen : Évelyne
Nicolas Jouxtel : Samuel
Léane Grimaud : Julia
Gérard Depardieu : The cardiologist
Enrico Macias : The tailor
Jacques Spiesser : The prefect
François Berland : Monsieur Daumergue
Charlotte Desgeorges : Patricia
Étienne Draber : Mronsieur Colfontaine
Anne Haybel : Madame Colfontaine
Alexandre Knafo : Lucas
Fariza Kraria : Madame Zamzem
Laurence Oltuski : Chloé
Ahmed Riyasat : Chandra
Alexis Sellam : Melloul
Isaac Sharry : Isaac
Mercedès Zarka : Aunt Mercedès

References

External links
 

2009 films
Films about Jews and Judaism
2000s French-language films
French comedy films
2009 comedy films
2000s French films